The men's 4 × 400 metres relay competition at the 2006 Asian Games in Doha, Qatar was held on 12 December 2006 at the Khalifa International Stadium.

Schedule
All times are Arabia Standard Time (UTC+03:00)

Records 

 United States's world record was rescinded in 2008.

Results 
Legend
DSQ — Disqualified

References 

Athletics at the 2006 Asian Games
2006